Steinkirchen (Low German: Steenkark) is a municipality in the district of Stade, Lower Saxony, Germany.

Geography 
The municipality is located in the Altes Land, the largest continuous orchard and fruit harvesting region in Europe. It is situated by the Elbe and Lühe rivers and is bordered by the municipalities (in clockwise order) Grünendeich, Jork, Mittelnkirchen, Guderhandviertel, Agathenburg and Hollern-Twielenfleth. The southeasterly third of the Elbe island Lühesand forms part of the municipal area.

History 
It belonged to the Prince-Archbishopric of Bremen. In 1648 the Prince-Archbishopric was transformed into the Duchy of Bremen, which was first ruled in personal union by the Swedish and from 1715 on by the Hanoverian Crown. In 1823 the Duchy was abolished and its territory became part of the Stade Region.

Politics

Municipality council 
As of February 2020, the council is composed of:

 Christian Democratic Union of Germany (CDU): 5 seats
 Social Democratic Party of Germany (SPD): 4 seats
 Alliance 90/The Greens (Grüne): 1 seat
 Independent: 1 seat

Mayor/Mayoress 
The mayoress of Steinkirchen is Sonja Zinke (CDU, elected as Independent) since 2014. Deputy mayor is Jürgen Michaelis (SPD).

Notable buildings 

 St. Martini et Nicolai church with the world famous organ of St. Martini et Nicolai [de] 
 Hogendiekbrücke, a pedestrian bascule bridge over the Lühe river
 Transmission tower of the Elbe Crossing 2, the tallest transmission towers in Europe

Economy and infrastructure

Transport 
Three bus lines run by the KVG Stade stop in Steinkirchen. These are:

 2050  Stade - Hollern-Twielenfleth - Steinkirchen - Jork - Hamburg-Cranz
 2030 Buxtehude - Dammhausen - Jork - Borstel - Steinkirchen
 2053 Grünendeich - Steinkirchen - Horneburg

These are part of the HVV and thus can be made use of with a regular ticket.

Additionally, some school bus and company bus lines operate in Steinkirchen.

Education 
Steinkirchen is home to the Schulzentrum Lühe, a school complex with an elementary school and an Oberschule.

Notable people 
 Dörte Hansen, linguist and writer, lived there for over 10 years

References

Municipalities in Lower Saxony
Stade (district)